Vincent Ekow Assafuah (born 27 September 1990) is a Ghanaian politician who is a member of the New Patriotic Party (NPP). He was the Public Relations Officer (PRO) for the Ministry of Education. He is the member of Parliament for the Old-Tafo Constituency in the Ashanti Region.

Early life and education 
Vincent Ekow Assafuah was born to Polykarp Assafuah and Paulina Assafuah in Kumasi. He attended Martyrs of Uganda Junior High School and proceeded to study General Arts at the St. Huberts’ Seminary in Kumasi. Assafuah holds a Bachelor of Arts degree in political science from the Kwame Nkrumah University of Science and Technology (KNUST), and Master of Arts degree in Economic Policy and a Master of Science in Development Finance both from University of Ghana (UG), Legon. He also holds a Bachelor of Law Degree (LLB) from Central University. He later proceeded to the Ghana Institute of Journalism where he obtained a Master of Arts in Public Relations. He is currently pursuing a Ph.D. degree in Public Administration and Public Policy.

Career 
Assafuah contested and won the National Service Personnel Association (NASPA) National president whilst doing his National Service after his unsuccessful attempt in USAG presidential election, he served in that role for one year. He was a special assistant to the Second lady Samira Bawumia from 2015 to 2017. In 2017, he was the acting Deputy Communication Director of the New Patriotic Party (NPP). After the New Patriotic Party came in power in January 2017, He was subsequently appointed as the head of public relations at the Ministry of Education in 2018. He is also a part-time lecturer at the Dominion University College.

Politics 
In June 2020, he stood for the New Patriotic Party seat for the Old Tafo Constituency after the incumbent Anthony Akoto Osei declared his intention not to contest the 2020 election. With a total votes of 299, Assafuah won the primaries against the 5 other contenders. His closest contender Dr. Louisa Serwaa Carole got 133 whilst the others which included Prince Odeneho Oppong got 90, Archibald Acquah had no votes, Emmanuel Obeng and Lord Inusah Lansah had 44 votes and 27 votes respectively.

He won the 2020 December parliamentary elections for the Old Tafo Constituency. He was declared the winner with 42,616  votes representing 74.55% against his closest contender Sahmudeen Mohammed Kamil of the National Democratic Congress (NDC) who had 14,405 votes representing 25.20%.

Committees 
He is a member of the House Committee and also a member of the Education Committee.

Personal life 
He is a Christian.

References 

New Patriotic Party politicians
Kwame Nkrumah University of Science and Technology alumni
University of Ghana alumni
Living people
1990 births
Ghanaian MPs 2021–2025